Niamh Moloney  (born 1969) is a scholar of law. She is Professor of Law at the London School of Economics.

Biography
Moloney studied at Trinity College Dublin and Harvard Law School. Her academic specialism is in EU financial market regulation.

She is on the editorial board of the European Law Review, and is a series editor of the "International Corporate Law and Financial Market Regulation" series of Cambridge University Press. Moloney is also on the commission board of the Central Bank of Ireland.

She was elected as a Fellow of the British Academy (FBA) in 2018. In 2019 she was awarded an honorary doctorate from the University of Zurich. In 2022 she was elected a member of the Royal Irish Academy.

References

1969 births
Living people
Academics of the London School of Economics
Alumni of Trinity College Dublin
Fellows of the British Academy
Harvard Law School alumni
British legal scholars
Members of the Royal Irish Academy